A process is a set of activities that interact to achieve a result.

Process may also refer to:

Process (film), 2004
Process (John Cale album), 2005
Process (Candy Lo album), 2007
Process (Sampha album), 2017
Process (anatomy), a projection or outgrowth of tissue from a larger body
Process art, an art movement and/or genre.
Process (computing), an instance of a computer program being executed
Process (iOS application), non-linear editing photography software for iOS devices

See also

The Process (disambiguation)
Process philosophy
"Part of the Process", a song by Morcheeba